Joseph Rajer (1918 - 1976) was an  American artist known for his woodcuts and serigraphs.

Biography
Rajer was born in 1918. He was a member of the Works Progress Administration New York graphic unit where he produced serigraphs (silk screens) and woodcuts. His work was included in 1944 Dallas Museum of Art exhibition of the National Serigraph Society. Rajer died in 1976.

Rajer's work is in the collection of the Metropolitan Museum of Art, the National Gallery of Art, and the Syracuse University Art Museum.

Gallery

References

External links

1918 births
1976 deaths
American printmakers
Federal Art Project artists
American male artists